Dendropsophus rhodopeplus (common name: red-skirted treefrog) is a species of frog in the family Hylidae.
It is found in the upper Amazon Basin in Bolivia, Brazil, Colombia, Ecuador, and Peru.

Dendropsophus rhodopeplus is a very abundant and widespread frog found in primary and secondary tropical rainforest. These frogs gather near permanent and temporary ponds and swamps for breeding.

Gallery

References

rhodopeplus
Amphibians of Bolivia
Amphibians of Brazil
Amphibians of Colombia
Amphibians of Ecuador
Amphibians of Peru
Amphibians described in 1858
Taxa named by Albert Günther
Taxonomy articles created by Polbot